The Meathouse Fork is a tributary of Middle Island Creek,  long, in north-central West Virginia in the United States.

Geography
The Meathouse Fork's entire course and watershed are in southern and central Doddridge County.

The Meathouse Fork collects its largest tributary, Toms Fork, at Sugar Camp.  In the vicinity of Sugar Camp and Blandville, it is paralleled by West Virginia Route 18.

History
The origin of the name of this watershed and community, given by the earliest white settlers in the 1820s, was detailed by a local historian a century later: On this spot of ground hunters from other sections who came to this community to hunt deer and bear built a log cabin in which to store their meat until they could move it to their homes in other and, sometimes, remote sections. From this meat house, the branch of Middle Island Creek which extends from near Smithburg to Big Isaac took the name of Meat House Fork.

See also
List of rivers of West Virginia

References 

Rivers of West Virginia
Rivers of Doddridge County, West Virginia